Abhayam is a 1991 Malayalam children's film written by Shibu Chakravarthy, directed by Sivan, produced by Children's Film Society of India (CFSI), starring Madhu, Parvathy Jayaram, Tarun Kumar, Ramachandran, Kottayam Santha, Raghavan and Baby Ambili. The film had a dubbed release in Hindi as Main Phir Aaunga.

Awards
The film has won the following awards.
 7th International Children's Film Festival, India
 Silver Elephant Award
 Special Jury Award
 39th National Film Awards
 Best Children's Film
 Film Festival Raggazzi, Bellinzona, Switzerland
 Prize "Environment and Quality of Life" signed by "Ecology Jury" composed of 14-16 children to the Director.
 1st Uruguay Children Film Festival
 Special Mention and Award statue made of earth and Certificate to the Director.

References

External links

1990s Malayalam-language films
Indian children's films
Best Children's Film National Film Award winners